Boreus coloradensis is a species of snow scorpionfly in the family Boreidae. It is found in North America.

References

Boreus
Articles created by Qbugbot
Insects described in 1955
Insects of North America